The National Indoor Athletics Centre is an indoor track and field athletics sports venue in the Cyncoed area of Cardiff, capital of  Wales.  It is sited on the Cardiff Metropolitan University Campus and is one of the main facilities used by Welsh Athletics, which organises the Cardiff branch of the Athletics Development Centre at the National Indoor Athletics Centre.

The track facilities include:
200m, 4 lane banked track
60m, 8 lane straight track
120m, 6 lane straight track which finishes outside the main arena

A centre of sporting excellence opened at the site in January 2011 by First Minister Carwyn Jones and Wales football manager Gary Speed. The Sport and Exercise Medicine Centre provides elite facilities for students, athletes and the wider public. 
There are sports medicine and physiotherapy professionals located on-site with services available not only to performance level athletes, but also the general public. The sports medicine practitioners can work with athletes and players to identify potential injury risk and therefore work to prevent injuries from occurring. The centre also boasts renowned sports psychologists, offering a range of individual or group sessions to help athletes enhance performance.

See also
 Sport in Cardiff

References

External links
Cardiff Met National Indoor Athletics Centre website

Sports venues in Cardiff
Athletics (track and field) venues in Wales